Canadian speed limits are set by different levels of government (federal, provincial, and municipal), depending on the jurisdiction under which the road falls, resulting in differences from province to province. The limits have been posted in kilometres per hour (km/h) since September 1, 1977. Before then, when Canada used Imperial units, speed limits were in miles per hour (mph).

Statutory speed limits

Statutory speed limits are default speed limits set by statute in each province or territory. They apply on roads which do not have posted speed limits.

Posted speed limits may differ significantly from the statutory speed limit. For example, in Alberta, Highway 1A has a statutory maximum speed limit of 100 km/h but a posted speed limit of 30 km/h near . 

Statutory speed limits for school zones tend to be  in urban areas and 50 km/h in rural areas.

Formerly, British Columbia's Okanagan Connector and Highway 19 also possessed 120 km/h limits, but have since been reduced to 110 km/h.

"N/A" means there is no such roadway in the province or territory. This table contains the statutory maximum speed limits, in kilometres per hour, on roads in each category.

This table contains typical daytime speed limits, in kilometres per hour, on typical roads in each category. The values shown are not necessarily the fastest or slowest posted limit.

Regulations

Community safety zones

In Ontario, speeding fines double in areas identified as "Community Safety Zones".

Construction zones

In most Canadian provinces, as in most other locales, speed violation fines are double (or more) in construction zones, although in Ontario and Alberta, this only applies if workers are present in the construction zone.

Racing, contests and stunt driving

In Ontario, as of September 2007, drivers caught exceeding the posted speed limit by 50 km/h or more may have the vehicle that they are driving impounded immediately for seven days, have their licence suspended for seven days, and have to appear before the court. For a first conviction, they face an additional $2,000–$10,000 fine and six demerit points; they may also face up to six months in jail and licence suspension of up to two years. For a second conviction within 10 years of the first conviction, their licence may be suspended for up to 10 years.

Truck speed limiters

In 2012, an Ontario court ruled that the law violated the Canadian Charter of Rights and Freedoms, however the law was upheld by the Ontario Court of Appeal in 2015.

Radar detectors

Radar detectors in Canada are legal only in British Columbia, Alberta and Saskatchewan. They are illegal to use or possess in the other provinces and all three territories. Regardless of whether they are used or not, police and law enforcement officers may confiscate radar detectors, operational or not, and impose substantial fines in provinces where radar detectors are illegal. Quebec penalizes $500 for use of a radar detector, along with confiscation of the device.

Signage

A speed limit sign reads "MAXIMUM XX", such as "MAXIMUM 80" for 80 km/h. A minimum speed sign reads "XX MINIMUM", such as "60 MINIMUM" for 60 km/h.

Review of speed limits

British Columbia
In British Columbia, a review of speed limits conducted in 2002 and 2003 for the Ministry of Transportation found that posted limits on investigated roads were unrealistically low for 1,309 km and unrealistically high for 208 km. The report recommended increasing speed limits on multi-lane limited-access highways constructed to high design standards from 110 km/h to 120 km/h. As described in that report, the Ministry is currently using "Technical Circular T-10/00 ... to assess speed limits. The practice considers the 85th percentile speed, road geometry, roadside development, and crash history."

Ontario

Ontario's first provincial legislation governing automobile use came into effect in 1903, which included a  speed limit.
 
In 1976, the maximum speed limit for freeways was reduced to 60 mph, while the rural limit was reduced to 50 mph, except for main highways running through northern Ontario, which were reduced to 55 mph.

In 2013, "speed too fast / exceed speed limit" contributed to 18.4% of all collisions, while "speeding" accounted for 55.2% of all driving convictions. An Ontario-based group is lobbying to increase speed limits from 100 km/h to 120–130 km/h (80 mph).

In 2015, the Ontario government announced a plan to reduce residential speed limits from the statutory default 50 km/h, either by reducing the statutory limit to 40 km/h or by giving municipalities the option to set their own statutory speed limits, as well as allowing posted speed limits in school zones to be lowered to 30 km/h.

In 2021, due to the COVID-19 pandemic significantly reducing traffic in 2020, the trial was extended until 2023. Two other areas will start a  speed limit trial, on Highway 400 from MacTier to Nobel, and Highway 11 from Emsdale to South River.

References

Canada